A priest (poacher's, game warden's or angler's "priest"), sometimes called a fish bat, or “persuader” is a tool for killing game or fish.

The name "priest" comes from the notion of administering the "last rites" to the fish or game. Anglers often use priests to quickly kill fish.

Description
Priests usually come in the form of a heavy metal head attached to a metal or wooden stick. The small baton is a blunt instrument used for quickly killing fish or game. Early versions are made of lignum vitae (Latin for "wood of life"), the densest hardwood. One example is described as "Lead filled head. Brass ring to handle. With large Head for dispatching Game. Size overall 14 inches long".

In culture

 Identified as a "keeper's priest" the tool is a featured murder weapon in Series 12 of the BBC's Dalziel and Pascoe, Episodes 2 and 3, "Under Dark Stars", which left a round bruised mark on impact.
 Used as the murder weapon of convenience in Series 8 of the BBC's Father Brown, Episode 7, "The River Corrupted," thereby framing the owner of the tool.
 Tommy "Fishpriest" Barth (portrayed by Ethan Hawk) the main character in the "Fishpriest" podcast series, is nicknamed after his weapon of choice.

References

 Smart, Alastair Fish Welfare at Harvest: Killing Me Softly
 https://www.imdb.com/title/tt20202302/plotsummary?ref_=tt_ov_pl

Fishing equipment